The 2013 VCU Rams men's soccer team will represent Virginia Commonwealth University during the 2013 NCAA Division I men's soccer season. The Rams will be playing in the Atlantic 10 Conference for their second season.

Background

Competitions

Spring exhibitions

Preseason

Regular season

A10 Table

Results summary

Results by round

Match reports 
Below are confirmed games for 2013.

Atlantic 10 Tournament

NCAA Tournament

Statistics

Appearances and goals 

|}

Source: VCU Athletics

Top goalscorers

Transfers

In

Out

See also 
 2013 Atlantic 10 Conference men's soccer season
 2013 NCAA Division I men's soccer season
 2013 in American soccer

References 

VCU Rams men's soccer seasons
VCU Rams
Vcu Rams
VCU Rams
VCU Rams